William Emory Nusz (November 2, 1859 – July 26, 1903) was an American professional baseball player who played in one game for the Washington Nationals of the Union Association during the  season. He was born in Frederick, Maryland and died in Baltimore, Maryland at the age of 44.

External links

Major League Baseball outfielders
Baseball players from Maryland
Washington Nationals (UA) players
1869 births
1903 deaths
Albany Governors players
York (minor league baseball) players
Chattanooga (minor league baseball) players
19th-century baseball players